"Synchronicity I" is a song by the Police, and the opening track from their album Synchronicity. Written by Sting, the track was also released as a Japanese-only single.

Background
"Synchronicity I", as well as its more famous counterpart "Synchronicity II", features lyrics that are inspired by Carl Jung's theory of synchronicity. Also included in the lyrics is a term from "The Second Coming," "Spiritus Mundi" (translating to "spirit of the world"), which William Butler Yeats used to refer to the collective unconscious, another of Jung's theories. Like other songs on Synchronicity, "Synchronicity I" is driven by a synthesizer riff.

Although it only served as an album track for Synchronicity in Britain and the US, "Synchronicity I" was released as the second and final single from the album in Japan, backed with "Someone to Talk To," a non-album B-side which appeared as the B-side to "Wrapped Around Your Finger" in Britain and "King of Pain" in America. The song was also used as the opening track of the band's set-list during the Synchronicity Tour.

When asked how "Synchronicity I" is connected to "Synchronicity II," Stewart Copeland said, "I've had Sting up against the wall on this issue before, and he point blank refuses to explain the connection. None of us in the band can even remember which one's which. The only way I can keep them straight is that 'Synch I' has Sting's cool sequencer part, that 'dunga dunga dung' thing that I, to this day, get all the credit for. People think it's me playing some percussive instrument, and I have to put them right. It was real 'rama-lama' way of starting our set on tour, though it almost killed me to start with that kind of onslaught every night."

According to Summers, there was originally going to be a link between this song and counterpart "Synchronicity II":

Reception
Robert Santelli of Relix Magazine said, "'Synchronicity I' is as close as the Police have ever flirted with musical anarchy: nothing seems to fit as each musician drains himself with relentless pokes and punches that ultimately ends in a KO." New Musical Express writer Richard Cook described the song as "a revision of 'Message in a Bottle' dynamics to sweep aside the cobwebs of inactivity." Adam Sweeting of Melody Maker claimed, "Indeed listening to this opening track, 'Synchronicity I', it doesn't take much of a leap of imagination to foresee the Police as a fusion group." It was noted as "a trifle explaining the title concept [of Synchronicity]" by Richard C. Walls of Creem.

Stephen Thomas Erlewine of AllMusic commented positively on "Synchronicity I," saying that on Synchronicity, "the group relies heavily on jazzy textures for Sting's songs, which only work on the jumping, marimba-driven 'Synchronicity I.'" BigHans of Sputnik Music, despite not naming the track an essential track from Synchronicity, listed the track as one of the "other recommendations" from the album.

Personnel
Sting - bass, vocals, keyboards, drum machine
Andy Summers – guitar, keyboards
Stewart Copeland – drums

Cover versions
The Gil Evans Orchestra produced an instrumental cover of the song. It was performed together with Sting on July 11, 1987 on the occasion of the Umbria Jazz Festival in Perugia.

References

The Police songs
1983 singles
Songs written by Sting (musician)
Song recordings produced by Hugh Padgham
1983 songs
A&M Records singles